Sylvia Lark (1947–1990) was a Native American/Seneca artist, curator, and educator. She best known as an Abstract expressionist painter and printmaker. Lark lived in the San Francisco Bay Area for many years.

Early life and education 
Lark was born in 1947 in Buffalo, New York. She went to high school at Nardin Academy in Buffalo. Lark attended school at the University of Siena; University at Buffalo (formally State University of New York, Buffalo) where she received her B.A. degree in 1969; Mills College; and the University of Wisconsin–Madison where she received her M.A. degree in 1970 and M.F.A. degree in 1972.

Career 
Starting in 1972, Lark taught art at California State University, Sacramento where she remained until 1976. In 1977, she received a Fulbright-Hays Program grant and traveled and study in Korea and Japan. Lark taught at the University of California, Berkeley from 1977 until 1990. Students of Lark's included Shirin Neshat. She was awarded the Distinguished Teaching Award for teaching studio art by the College Art Association posthumously in 1991.

Her early work used symbols and patterns, and there was a shift in her later career with more abstraction and overlapping colors with delicate textured surfaces. She painted in oils and encaustics and printed monotypes. Her 1983 painting series Jokhang, featured many textures and layers of colors painted over or under black leaves. This series was a response to her visit to Jokhang Temple in Lhasa and her study of Tibetan spirituality. Lark was curator of the exhibition, Prints: New Points of View (1978) at the Open Ring Galleries in Sacramento.

In 1992, she was the second inductee into Nardin Academy's Alumnae Hall of Fame. Lark had served on the National Board of the Women's Caucus for Art from 1978 to 1984; and was the Regional Coordinator for the Coalition of Women's Art Organization from 1978 to 1990.

Death and legacy 
Lark died on cancer at the age of 43 in Berkeley on December 27, 1990.

Her works are in the museum collections at the Fine Arts Museums of San Francisco, Metropolitan Museum of Art, Crocker Art Museum, Sheldon Museum of Art, Oakland Museum of California, and the Museum of Contemporary Art, Chicago.

Exhibitions 

 1975 – Drawings and Prints by Howard Hack, Sylvia Lark, and Leonard Sussman, San Francisco Museum of Modern Art, San Francisco, California
 1977 – Lark–Palmer Prints and Sculptures, included Sylvia Lark and Jon Palmer, Fisher Gallery, University of Southern California, Los Angeles, California
1977 – Look, Touch, Rub, Pull, Smell, and Hear, included Carlos Villa, Chisato Nishioka Watanabe, Phil Weidman, Phil Hitchcock, Jock Reynold, Laureen Landau, Sylvia Lark, William Maxwell, Bruce Guttin, Paul DeMarinis, and Jim Pomeroy, Artspace, Sacramento, California
1980 – Contemporary Trends in Presentation Drawings, curated by Roberta Loach, Linda Langston; including J.J. Aasen, Walter Askin, Gary Brown, Eleanor Dickinson, Bob Anderson, Harry Lynn Krizan, Judith Linhares, Roy DeForest, Robert Freimark, Sylvia Lark, Roberta Loach, Norman Lundin, Shane Weare, Vince Perez, Mary Snowden, Palo Alto Art Center, Palo Alto, California
 1980 – Bhirasri Institute of Modern Art, Bangkok, Thailand
 1983 – Galerie Akmak, Berlin, Germany
 1984 – (solo exhibition), Jeremy Stone Gallery, San Francisco, California
 1985 – Galerie Hartje, Frankfurt, Germany
 1986 – The 54th Hanga Annual, Japan-California Print Exhibition, Tokyo Metropolitan Art Museum, Tokyo, Japan.
 1987 – The Ethnic Idea, curated by Andrée Maréchal-Workman, including Lauren Adams, Robert Colescott, Dewey Crumpler, Mildred Howard, Oliver Lee Jackson, Mary Lovelace O'Neal, Joe Sam, Elisabeth Zeilon, Tom Holland, Celeste Conner, Jean LaMarr, Sylvia Lark, Leta Ramos, Judy Foosaner, Joseph Goldyne, Belinda Chlouber, Carlos Villa, Berkeley Art Center, Berkeley, California
 1991 – North Dakota Museum of Art, Grand Fork, North Dakota
 2002 – Art/Women/California, Paralells and Intersections: 1950–2000, San Jose Museum of Art, San Jose, California

See also 

 List of Native American artists

References

Further reading 

  includes recipes by Lark.

External links 

 Sylvia Lark papers, 1971- 1999, undated from the Archives of American Art, Smithsonian Institution

1947 births
1990 deaths
Seneca people
Artists from Buffalo, New York
University at Buffalo alumni
University of Wisconsin–Madison alumni
California State University, Sacramento faculty
University of California, Berkeley faculty
Deaths from cancer in California
Artists from Berkeley, California
Abstract expressionist artists
American women printmakers
20th-century American printmakers
20th-century American women artists
University of Siena alumni